The West Durham Ironheads are Junior "B" box lacrosse team from Pickering, Ontario, Canada.  The Ironheads play in the OLA Junior B Lacrosse League.

History
The West Durham Ironheads (formerly the Markham Ironheads) are a relatively new team.  The 2006 season was their fifth in the league and they have shown substantial growth, gaining access to the playoffs in their past three seasons.

 Their first-ever OLA Junior "B" game took place on April 20, 2002, against the Onondaga Warriors (now of the Iroquois league)—a 20–9 loss.  Their first-ever victory came on April 28, 2002, against the Nepean Knights.  In their fourth-ever game, they beat the Knights by a score of 9–5.

They have yet to win a playoff round.

The Ironheads are the Jr. B affiliate of the Toronto Beaches of the Ontario Jr. A Lacrosse League. 

In 2010, the Ironheads moved to Ajax and played out of the Ajax Community Centre while retaining the "Markham Ironheads" name. In 2017, the Ironheads officially changed their name to the "West Durham Ironheads" and affiliated with the West Durham Minor Lacrosse Association. In 2018, the Ironheads moved once again, this time to Pickering. The West Durham Ironheads now play their home games at Delany Arena at the Pickering Recreation Centre. 

On one hot night in the summer of 2013, the Ironheads equipment manager Sean "Boa" Gillespie invented the "Seannie Shuffle", in which he danced while wiping the floor of sweat and condensation while also getting players and fans to cheer uncontrollably. "Seannie Shuffles" are usually followed by a lengthy towel wave while full sprinting back to the bench.

Season-by-season results
Note: GP = Games played, W = Wins, L = Losses, T = Ties, Pts = Points, GF = Goals for, GA = Goals against

References

External links
Ironheads Webpage
The Bible of Lacrosse
Unofficial OLA Page

Ontario Lacrosse Association teams
Pickering, Ontario